Křtiny is a market town in Blansko District in the South Moravian Region of the Czech Republic. It has about 800 inhabitants.

Geography
It lies in the Drahany Highlands, on the boundary of the Moravian Karst Protected Landscape Area.

History
The first written mention of Křtiny is from 1237, in a deed of Pope Gregory IX.

Sights
Křtiny is known for an significant European pilgrimage site administered by the Premonstratensians. In 1718, a Baroque pilgrim complex was created by the original project of Jan Santini Aichel, but was modified during construction and was never fully completed. It comprises the Church of the Name of the Virgin Mary with a Gothic statue of the Virgin Mary and an ossuary and the adjacent Křtiny Manor from the 19th century, formerly the Provost residence.

In the municipality is the karst show cave Výpustek, formerly a secret army cave shelter.

References

External links

Market towns in the Czech Republic
Populated places in Blansko District